Clune is an anglicised form of the Irish names of either O Cluanain or McCluin. O Cluanain dervies from the Irish "cluana" meaning either "deceitful", "flattering" or "rogue." McCluin comes from the Irirsh Gaelic "glun" meaning "knee".

People
Notable people with the surname include:

Adam Clune (born 1995), Australian rugby league player
Conor Clune (1893–1920), Irish scholar and activist killed during Bloody Sunday (1920)
Daniel A. Clune (born 1949), United States diplomat
Deirdre Clune (born 1959), Irish politician
Don Clune (born 1952), American football player
Frank Clune (1893–1971), Australian writer
Henry W. Clune (1890–1995), American journalist and novelist
Jackie Clune (born 1965), British entertainer and writer
John J. Clune (1932–1992), former Director of Athletics at the United States Air Force Academy
Michael W. Clune, American writer
Patrick Clune (1865–1935), Catholic Archbishop of Perth, Western Australia
Richard Clune (born 1987), Canadian ice hockey player
Thelma Clune (1900–1992), Australian artist
Wally Clune (born 1931), Canadian retired ice hockey player
W. H. Clune (1862–1927), American railroad owner and filmmaker
Michael W. Clune (born 1976), American writer and critic

See also

Clune (disambiguation)
Clunn (surname)
Clunes

References